Joseph Fogerty & Son was an Irish architectural firm active from the 1870s until 1887 in Limerick and throughout the west of Ireland. It was composed of Joseph Fogerty Sr. and his son Robert Fogerty.

Works
1877 St Michael's Church of Ireland Church, Limerick, Pery Square  
1879 Woodsdown House, Annacotty, Limerick

References	

Companies established in the 1870s
Companies disestablished in 1887
Gothic Revival architects
Irish architects
Limerick (city)
Irish ecclesiastical architects